Point Pleasant Park is a large, mainly forested municipal park at the southern tip of the Halifax peninsula. It once hosted several artillery batteries, and still contains the Prince of Wales Tower - the oldest Martello tower in North America (1796).  The park is a popular recreational spot for Haligonians, as it hosts forest walks and affords views across the harbour and out toward the Atlantic.

Plays are performed in the park every summer by a professional theatre company called Shakespeare by the Sea. The performances take place at Cambridge Battery, and include both Shakespearean productions and original musicals based on classic fairy tales for audiences of all ages. The company also operates the 80-seat Park Place Theatre in the lower parking lot of the park, which is used as a rain venue during the summer, and for fall/winter indoor productions.

Point Pleasant Park is owned by the British government under the administration of the Minister of the Department of Canadian Heritage and is leased to Halifax Regional Municipality for a ceremonial 1 shilling per year. The original lease for the land was negotiated by Sir William Young in 1866.

History

18th-19th Century

St. Aspinquid Chapel 
St. Aspinquid's Chapel was established by Priest Louis-Pierre Thury at Chebucto (present day Halifax, Nova Scotia) in the late 17th century. The chapel is a natural stone amphitheatre located by Chain Rock Battery on the Northwest Arm at Point Pleasant Park.  There are numerous notable people who were interred in the burial grounds around the chapel. The chapel was also the location of the Mi’kmaq celebration the Feast of St. Aspinquid (St. Aspinquid's Day), which was conducted through much of the 18th century.  The Chapel is also the site of a battle during the French and Indian War between two Mi'kmaq chiefs (1760).

Establishing Halifax 
In 1749, Edward Cornwallis arrived under instruction of the British Government to create a sizeable military and civilian settlement of 4000 in Halifax which sparked Father Le Loutre's War.  He first settled Point Pleasant Park but then, being too exposed to the elements, moved the settlement below Citadel Hill. Halifax was to become a strategic settlement for the British and fortifications were primarily intended to prevent enemy ships from getting into the Halifax Harbour. Fortifications began to be constructed at present-day Point Pleasant Park toward the end of the French and Indian War.

There were a total of seven fortifications constructed: Chain Rock, Chain Battery, Point Pleasant Battery, Northwest Arm Battery, Fort Ogilvie, Prince of Wales Tower and Cambridge Battery. Most were rebuilt or modified four or five times over the subsequent 200 years.

French and Indian War 
There were four defences that were constructed during the French and Indian War: Chain Battery, Chain Rock, Point Pleasant Battery and Northwest Arm Battery.  The defences were built of logs, earth, and stone. They were built with wood-burning fireplaces, and furnaces were later added for smelting cannon shot. Chain Battery and Chain Rock were basic fortifications built on the natural terrain to protect the Northwest Arm. Unlike most of the other fortifications, the battery here was not rebuilt in the 19th century, so it retains its original 1762 layout. Because it was abandoned so early, the area has been reforested for most of the historic period. Point Pleasant Battery is one of the oldest fortification batteries. Though Point Pleasant Battery was first constructed in 1762, what is visible today dates mostly from the early 20th century.  The fourth battery - the Northwest Arm Battery - was built during the war, just west of Point Pleasant, was damaged in 1895 and was falling into the sea. It was moved further along the Northwest Arm shore.  Northwest Arm Battery was first built in 1762 and disused after the 1860s. Archeological remains associated with its barracks include a summer house built for the Park in the 1880s. The battery here retains its early 19th century configuration.

French Revolutionary Wars 

In 1792, during the French Revolutionary Wars, the threat of an immediate French attack alerted the British military in Halifax to the possibility of a landing in the harbour and batteries were upgraded and improved. Fort Ogilvie was built at this time and is located in the eastern part of Point Pleasant Park. It was built by the order of General Ogilvie, then commander of the Halifax garrison. Ogilvie named the battery after himself.

In 1796-97, a battery was built on high ground behind the point at a location capable of defending the point batteries. A few years later, the battery was converted to a large round stone tower known as the Prince of Wales Tower, similar to the Martello Towers built in large numbers elsewhere by the British military. The Prince of Wales Tower is 26 feet high and is 72 feet in diameter. The exposed material is ironstone rubble masonry, with  walls. The original construction permitted six mounted guns on the roof and four guns on the second storey.

Further modifications were made over the next seventy years. By 1813, the Tower mounted four 6-pound guns on garrison carriages on its barrack level, two 24-pound guns on traversing platforms and six 24-pound carronades on traversing slides on top. After 1864, the Tower was used as a self-defensible depot magazine.

The park was the site of several small farms during the early settlement of Halifax. A rock outcropping at Black Rock Beach was used to gibbet the bodies of executed criminal such as the pirate Edward Jordan in 1809.

Cambridge Battery is situated back from the Point Pleasant and Northwest Arm batteries along the shore. It was approved in 1862 and completed in 1868. The battery was named in honour of the Duke of Cambridge, who was the head of the military during much of Queen Victoria's reign.

20th century 

The Cambridge Battery was abandoned by the time of the First World War.

In 1929, the military temporarily vacated the park before returning in 1938 during the Second World War. Although the Martello tower ceased to be important for military purposes in the late 19th century, some of the other fortifications in the Park continued to be used by the military until the close of the Second World War. Fort Ogilvie and Cambridge Battery were upgraded with modern weapons during the Second World War. A gun from this era is still visible at Fort Ogilvie.

Small amounts of stone were quarried in the park in the 19th century, the small quarries today forming a pond near the park entrance. In the 1920s, the Halifax streetcar line was extended into the park as far as the Prince of Wales Tower but the route was abandoned in the 1940s.

The park was the target of a "group" calling itself "Loki 7" in 1994, when they planted a pipe bomb in a garbage bin. Nobody was injured.

In 1943 a large Canadian steamship, SS Point Pleasant Park, was named after the park. The mayor of Halifax presented the ship's captain with a framed picture of the Yonge Street gate which was displayed in the dining room aboard the ship until it was torpedoed in 1945.

In 2000 the Canadian Food Inspection Agency planned to cut 10,000 trees to halt an outbreak of Brown Spruce Longhorn Beetle (Tetropium fuscum). This plan was challenged by the Friends of Pt. Pleasant Park in the courts, which resulted in a temporary injunction stopping the cutting. The injunction was later removed but there was a reduction in tree cutting to less than 2000.

21st century

In September 2003, Point Pleasant Park was devastated by Hurricane Juan. Nearly three quarters of the park's trees were knocked down and the park remained closed until June 2004. While there were still trees remaining, the park now had a very thin canopy.

Assistance from the Canadian federal government allowed Halifax Regional Municipality to make significant progress in the recovery and renewal of the park. As of June 2008 over 70,000 Acadian forest trees had been planted in the park, surpassing the number of trees lost to Hurricane Juan.

The comprehensive plan for Point Pleasant Park proposed long-term care for the park's forest based on Canada's national standard for sustainable forest management. The process of Adaptive Management would be used to guide the renewal and care of Point Pleasant, one of Canada's oldest urban parks.

Military monuments

Point Pleasant is the location to numerous monuments associated with the heritage of Halifax and the sea. The largest is the Halifax Monument, better known as the Sailor's Memorial, which commemorates members of the Royal Canadian Navy, the Canadian Merchant Navy and Canadian Army who were lost at sea. It was first erected in 1924 in a headland near the park but moved to Citadel Hill in 1954 when names from World War II were added. However the cross on Citadel Hill had decayed by 1966 so it was replaced in 1967 by the present monument in Point Pleasant. The current memorial consists of a Cross of Sacrifice inscribed with the names of 3257 Canadian men and women who were buried at sea as a result of the World Wars. The most well-known casualties listed on the monument are the nursing sisters who died on the HMHS Llandovery Castle during World War 1. (415 Canadians from naval and merchant ships who died in the Atlantic Ocean during World War I.) The original monument has been replaced by two later monuments.

The ship's anchor from the aircraft carrier HMCS Bonaventure serves as a monument to the men and women who died while serving the Canadian Navy during Peacetime. A cairn marks the lives lost in the sinking of the Canadian Merchant Navy ship SS Point Pleasant Park in 1945. A monument facing the Northwest Arm honour Walter Hose, a naval commander who helped build the Royal Canadian Navy while another honours the families who ran the Northwest Arm ferry and performed many rescues. National Historic Site plaques in the park commemorate the role of Halifax as Naval Port and the Battle between HMS Shannon and USS Chesapeake in 1813.

Flora 

Trees include:
 Acer saccharum - Sugar maple 
 Acer rubrum - Red maple  
 Abies balsamea - Balsam Fir 
 Betula papyrifera - White birch  
 Malus domestica - Apple
 Picea rubens - Red spruce  
 Pinus resinosa - Red pine
 Pinus strobus - White pine 
 Prunus pensylvanica - Pin Cherry
 Quercus rubra - Red oak  
 Sorbus americana - Mountain ash  
 Tsuga canadensis - Hemlock tree

Shrubs include:
 Amelanchier canadensis - Shadbush  
 Aralia hispida - Bristly sarsaparilla
 Aralia nudicaulis - Wild sarsaparilla
 Comptonia peregrina - Sweet-fern
 Cornus canadensis - Bunchberry
 Diervilla lonicera - Northern Bush Honeysuckle 
 Epigaea repens - Mayflower
 Ilex mucronata - Mountain holly, formerly Nemopanthus
 Kalmia angustifolia - Sheep laurel
 Mitchella repens Two-eyed berry 
 Prunus pensylvanica Pin Cherry
 Rubus - Berries
 Vaccinium angustifolium - Blueberry 
 Vaccinium vitis-idaea - Partridgeberry 
 Viburnum cassinoides - Witherod 
 Viburnum nudum - Northern Wild Raisin

Ferns and mosses include:
 Lycopodium - Club mosses
 Equisetum arvense - horsetail
 Pteridium aquilinum - Bracken fern

Wildflowers include:
 Aster - Michaelmas daisies
 Barbarea vulgaris - wintercress
 Clintonia borealis - yellow clintonia 
 Coptis groenlandica - Goldthread
 Gaultheria procumbens - Wintergreen  
 Houstonia caerulea - Bluets
 Maianthemum canadense - Wild lily of the valley 
 Potentilla simplex - Common cinquefoil
 Sisyrinchium montanum - blue-eyed grass
 Solidago - Goldenrod
 Trientalis borealis - Starflower
 Tussilago farfara - Coltsfoot
 Viola cucullata - Marsh blue violet

Transportation
Point Pleasant Park is served by Halifax Transit's route "29 Barrington", which terminates at a turning loop at the Tower Road entrance of the park.

See also 
Military history of Nova Scotia

References

Bibliography 

 Kitz, Janet, and Gary Castle, Point Pleasant Park: An Illustrated History, 1999, Pleasant Point Publishing, Halifax.
 Directors of Point Pleasant Park, Point Pleasant Park brochure, undated.
 Don Awalt.The Mi’kmaq and Point Pleasant Park. 2004
 
 
 How Halifax sealed deal to rent Point Pleasant Park for shilling a year. 'Shilling ceremony' taking place to celebrate the historic park lease that's in effect until 2865Katy Parsons, May 28 2017. CBC

Flora 

 
 
 
 
 
 
 
 
 Pam Berman. New invasive rose at Point Pleasant Park on the rise: Community council asks Halifax staff for strategy to remove multiflora rose. CBC Nova Scotia 1 July 2016
 Invasive Species. Halifax Regional Municipality 2016

Images

External links

 HalifaxTrails.ca - Point Pleasant Park

Bike paths in Nova Scotia
Hiking trails in Nova Scotia
Parks in Halifax, Nova Scotia
Military forts in Nova Scotia
1866 establishments in Canada